Stanislaus S. Uyanto is an Indonesian statistician. He is a professor of statistics at Atma Jaya Catholic University of Indonesia. He is teaching statistics and mathematics at the Atma Jaya Catholic University of Indonesia,  Jakarta.

He is an alumnus of the State University of New York at Albany, where he earned his master's degree in mathematical statistics.  He also earned a master's degree in statistics from the State University of New York at Buffalo. He holds a Ph.D. in statistics from the School of Mathematics and Statistics at the University of Melbourne, Australia.

He is a regular member of the International Statistical Institute and a member of the American Statistical Association.

Publications

Books
Uyanto, Stanislaus S. Petunjuk Lengkap Pemrograman Komputer Dengan Bahasa C [A Complete Guide to Programming in C]. Jakarta: Penerbit PT Gramedia Sarana Indonesia (Grasindo). 
Uyanto, Stanislaus S. Pedoman Analisis Data Dengan SPSS [A Guide to Data Analysis Using SPSS]. Edisi-3. Yogyakarta: Penerbit Graha Ilmu, 2009.

Selected journal articles
Uyanto, Stanislaus S. (2021). An Extensive Comparisons of 50 Univariate Goodness-of-fit Tests for Normality”, Austrian Journal of Statistics, 51(3), 45–97. (https://doi.org/10.17713/ajs.v51i3.1279 )
Uyanto, Stanislaus S. (2020). "Power Comparisons of Five Most Commonly Used Autocorrelation Tests", Pakistan Journal of Statistics and Operation Research, 16(1), 119-130. (https://doi.org/10.18187/pjsor.v16i1.2691 ).
Uyanto, Stanislaus S. (2019). "Monte Carlo power comparison of seven most commonly used heteroscedasticity tests", Communications in Statistics - Simulation and Computation, Volume 51, No.4, pp.  2065-2082 (https://doi.org/10.1080/03610918.2019.1692031 ).
Uyanto, Stanislaus S. (2017). "Coefficient of Relationship for Two Symmetric Alpha-Stable Variables When Alpha in the Interval (1,2]", Communications in Statistics - Theory and Methods, Volume 46, No.14, pp. 6874-6881  (https://dx.doi.org/10.1080/03610926.2015.1137599 ).

External links
 Gazette 31 Vol 3
  Regression and Time Series for Infinitely Divisible Distributions ...
 Atma Jaya Catholic University of Indonesia
 Pedoman Analisis Data Dengan SPSS Edisi-3

University of Melbourne alumni
University at Albany, SUNY alumni
University at Buffalo alumni
Indonesian statisticians
Indonesian Christians
Year of birth missing (living people)
Living people